4 O'Clock Club is a British children's television series, which premiered on 13 January 2012 on CBBC and BBC HD. A second series began airing on 4 January 2013, and the third series premiered on 20 December 2013. Series 4 began airing on 29 January 2015. A fifth series was commissioned, and was filmed between June 2015 and August 2015, and began airing on 25 February 2016.  

A sixth series began airing on 2 March 2017, with it ending on 18 May 2017. A seventh series was commissioned and filmed in 2017, with it airing between January and April 2018. An eighth series began on 19 December 2018 with a Christmas special. On 29 December 2019 through to 5 January 2020, 3 episode Specials aired on CBBC and BBC iPlayer titled 'Flashbacks' which saw past and present cast members react to their favourite and funniest moments from the show. The Specials were filmed as part of a celebration of the show hitting its 100th episode milestone in Series 8. Series 9 began airing on 4 February 2020.

Series overview

Specials

Episodes

Series 1 (2012)

Series 2 (2013)

Series 3 (2013–14)

Series 4 (2015)

Series 5 (2016)

Series 6 (2017)

Series 7 (2018)

Series 8 (2018-19)

Flashbacks (2019-20) 
In Series 8, The show's 100th episode aired and to celebrate the milestone, 3 episodes Titled 'Flashbacks' aired in late 2019 and early 2020 on CBBC and BBC iPlayer. These episodes consisted of past and present cast reacting to past episodes and their best moments from the show. The 3 episodes were filmed during the filming of Series 8.

Series 9 (2020)

References

Lists of British children's television series episodes